Player's Secrets of Binsada is an accessory for the 2nd edition of the Advanced Dungeons & Dragons fantasy role-playing game, published in 1996.

Contents
The Khinasi domain of Binsada is a matriarchal society of nomadic, clannish people for whom riding is second-nature.  The main fighting force of the Binsadans consists of fierce cavalry units, and the people are expansionist by nature.  The high priest of Binsada has recently had a vision of conquest, which has been galvanizing the populace and preparing them for a jihad.

One of the players in the campaign is encouraged to take on the role of the current queen's sister using a magical turban of disguise, as the much-loved queen has fallen victim to congenital insanity. The player must assume her identity and rule in her stead, and decide if and when to tell the populace the truth. The domain of Binsada is surrounded by powerful awnsheglien, and plot hooks given at the end of the supplement provide additional adventure ideas: the queen's trusted lieutenant threatens to expose the player's true identity, there is a rival after the regency, a couple of dungeons are provided to explore, and there is the matter of leading a religious war.

Publication history
Player's Secrets of Binsada was published by TSR, Inc. in 1996.

Reception
Cliff Ramshaw reviewed Player's Secrets of Binsada for Arcane magazine, rating it a 9 out of 10 overall. Ramshaw calls Binsada "wonderfully unique", and calls out the Binsadans as "a bit like the Mongols of old", noting that the founder of modern Binsada "is playfully named either 'Chengas Zaran' or 'Tengis Rhan'". He feels that anyone playing the ruler of Binsada "won't be bored" due to the plot hooks which provide "plenty of interest", and that players are "instructed to rule Binsada with 'unshakable confidence in the face of apparent disaster'. Sounds good to me."

References

Birthright (campaign setting) supplements
Role-playing game supplements introduced in 1996